The Umma Islamic Party is a political party in Saudi Arabia that was formed on 10 February 2011 in response to the Arab Spring. Formed by a collective of opposition members including Islamists and intellectuals, the party is pro-reform and demands representation and an end to absolute monarchy in the country. The party is run by a ten-member coordination committee and requested official recognition from the government as an official party. On 18 February, most of the party co-founders were arrested by Saudi authorities. All except for Sheikh Abd al-ʽAziz al-Wuhaibi were released later in 2011, subject to travel and teaching bans, after agreeing in writing not to carry out "anti-government activity".

Creation in 2011
The Umma Islamic Party was created on 9 February 2011 by an 11-member coordination committee of Islamists and intellectuals including Dr Abdullah Alsalim, Dr. Ahmad bin Sa'd al-Ghamidi, Sheikh Abd al-ʽAziz al-Wuhaibi and Sheikh Muhammad bin Husain al-Qahtani. The party is pro-reform and demands representation and an end to absolute monarchy in the country. The party requested official recognition from the government as an official party.

The Umma Islamic Party was part of the Umma Conference network headquartered in Istanbul, led by the Kuwait Hizb al-Umma and chaired by Hakim al-Mutayri, until it severed its ties in 2017 for increasing tutelage and lack of autonomy, though retaining its program in a revised edition.

2011 detentions
Al-Ghamidi, al-Dughaithir, al-Wuhaibi, al-Qahtani, al-Ghamidi, al-Majid and al-Khadhar were detained on 17 February 2011. Human Rights Watch stated that they "[appeared] to have been detained solely for trying to create a party whose professed aims included greater democracy and protection for human rights." Prior to his own arrest, al-Khadhar stated that his colleagues were apparently held in the Mabahith's ʽUlaysha Prison. The detained party co-founders were told that they would be released only if they signed a pledge to stop advocating for political reform, which they initially refused.

All except for al-Wuhaibi were conditionally released in 2011 after signing declarations that they would not carry out "anti-government activity". The release conditions included travel bans and teaching bans.

See also 
 Hizb ut-Tahrir
 Muslim Brotherhood
 Movement for Islamic Reform in Arabia

References

External links
 

Organizations of the Arab Spring
Saudi Arabian democracy movements
2011 establishments in Saudi Arabia
Political parties established in 2011
Political parties in Saudi Arabia
Islamism in Saudi Arabia
2011–2012 Saudi Arabian protests
Saudi Arabian opposition groups